Meg Pearce (born 1 July 1994) is an Australian field hockey player, who plays as a defender and midfielder.

Personal life
Meg Pearce grew up in Melbourne, Victoria.  Her father participates in Ironman events, and her mother runs in marathons.  Following after her father and sister, both hockey players, she started playing hockey when six years old, at the Doncaster Hockey Club, in the eastern suburbs of Melbourne.  After finishing secondary school, she studied arts at university, and began working as a personal trainer, before completing a double degree in commerce and nutrition.  She played on the Under-21 Victorian state team in 2014 and 2015, and played with the Victorian Vipers, before moving to Brisbane. She joined Brisbane Blaze for the 2019 season.  She later relocated to Perth, working in marketing for a financial services firm.

She is a scholarship holder at the Victorian Institute of Sport, as well as a member of Hockey Queensland's High Performance Squad.

Career

Domestic league
From 2013 to 2018, Pearce was a member of the Victorian Vipers in the Australian Hockey League (AHL).

Following an overhaul of the AHL in 2019, Hockey Australia introduced a new premier domestic league, the Sultana Bran Hockey One. Pearce was named in Brisbane Blaze team for the inaugural season of the competition.

International

Under–21
Pearce made her debut for the Australia U–21 team in 2013 at the Australian Youth Olympic Festival in Sydney. At the tournament, she won a gold medal.

Hockeyroos
In 2020, Pearce was named in the Hockeyroos squad for the first time.

She made her official debut for the team in 2021, during a test series against New Zealand in Palmerston North.

References

External links
 
 

1994 births
Living people
Australian female field hockey players
Female field hockey forwards
21st-century Australian women